Summer Hill is an electoral district of the Legislative Assembly in the Australian state of New South Wales. It is represented by Jo Haylen of the Labor Party.

Summer Hill is an urban electorate in Sydney's inner west centred on the suburb of Summer Hill from which it takes its name. It also includes the suburbs of Ashbury, Ashfield, Dulwich Hill, Haberfield, Lewisham and Marrickville.

Summer Hill is one of two new electorates (the other being Newtown) created in place of the abolished Marrickville for the 2015 state election. It takes its territory from areas previously belonging to the districts of Balmain, Canterbury, Marrickville and Strathfield.

Members for Summer Hill

Election results

References

Summer Hill
2015 establishments in Australia
Summer Hill